Austria participated in the Eurovision Song Contest 2021 with the song "Amen" written by Tobias Carshey, Ashley Hicklin and Jonas Thander. The song was performed by Vincent Bueno. On 26 March 2020, the Austrian broadcaster Österreichischer Rundfunk (ORF) announced that they had internally selected Vincent Bueno to compete at the 2022 contest in Rotterdam, the Netherlands after he was due to compete in the 2020 contest with "Alive" before the event's cancellation, while "Amen" was presented to the public on 10 March 2021.

Austria was drawn to compete in the second semi-final of the Eurovision Song Contest which took place on 20 May 2021. Performing during the show in position 5, "Amen" was not announced among the top 10 entries of the second semi-final and therefore did not qualify to compete in the final. It was later revealed that Austria placed twelfth out of the 17 participating countries in the semi-final with 66 points.

Background

The Austrian national broadcaster,  (ORF), broadcasts the event within Austria and organises the selection process for the nation's entry. ORF confirmed their intentions to participate at the 2021 Eurovision Song Contest on 26 March 2020. In  and since , ORF has held an internal selection to choose the artist and song to represent Austria at the contest.

Before Eurovision

Internal selection 
On 26 March 2020, ORF confirmed that Vincent Bueno would remain as Austria's representative for the Eurovision Song Contest 2021. Several songs, two of them titled "Dumb Human Bias" and "Parachute", were submitted by Bueno and shortlisted by the ORF Eurovision Song Contest Team, which collaborated with music expert Eberhard Forcher who worked on the selection of the Austrian entries since 2016. On 26 February 2021, the song "Amen" written by Tobias Carshey, Ashley Hicklin and Jonas Thander was announced by ORF as the Austrian entry for the Eurovision Song Contest 2021. The presentation of the song took place on 10 March 2021 during the radio show Ö3-Wecker, aired on Ö3.

Promotion 
Prior to the contest, Vincent Bueno specifically promoted "Amen" as the Austrian Eurovision entry on 30 April 2021 by performing during the final of the talent show Starmania 21 on ORF 1.

At Eurovision 
According to Eurovision rules, all nations with the exceptions of the host country and the "Big Five" (France, Germany, Italy, Spain and the United Kingdom) are required to qualify from one of two semi-finals in order to compete for the final; the top ten countries from each semi-final progress to the final. The European Broadcasting Union (EBU) split up the competing countries into six different pots based on voting patterns from previous contests, with countries with favourable voting histories put into the same pot. The semi-final allocation draw held for the Eurovision Song Contest 2020 on 28 January 2020 was used for the 2021 contest, which Austria was placed into the second semi-final, to be held on 20 May 2021, and was scheduled to perform in the first half of the show.

Once all the competing songs for the 2021 contest had been released, the running order for the semi-finals was decided by the shows' producers rather than through another draw, so that similar songs were not placed next to each other. Austria was set to perform in position 5, following the entry from Greece and before the entry from Poland.

The two semi-finals and the final were broadcast in Austria on ORF 1 with commentary by Andi Knoll. The Austrian spokesperson, who announced the top 12-point score awarded by the Austrian jury during the final, was Philipp Hansa.

Semi-final 
Austria performed fifth in the second semi-final, following the entry from Greece and preceding the entry from Poland. At the end of the show, Austria was not announced among the top 10 entries in the second semi-final and therefore failed to qualify to compete in the final. It was later revealed that Austria placed twelfth in the semi-final, receiving a total of 66 points: 13 points from the televoting and 53 points from the juries.

Voting 
Voting during the three shows involved each country awarding two sets of points from 1-8, 10 and 12: one from their professional jury and the other from televoting. Each nation's jury consisted of five music industry professionals who are citizens of the country they represent, with a diversity in gender and age represented. The judges assess each entry based on the performances during the second Dress Rehearsal of each show, which takes place the night before each live show, against a set of criteria including: vocal capacity; the stage performance; the song's composition and originality; and the overall impression by the act. Jury members may only take part in panel once every three years, and are obliged to confirm that they are not connected to any of the participating acts in a way that would impact their ability to vote impartially. Jury members should also vote independently, with no discussion of their vote permitted with other jury members. The exact composition of the professional jury, and the results of each country's jury and televoting were released after the grand final; the individual results from each jury member were also released in an anonymised form.

Below is a breakdown of points awarded to Austria and awarded by Austria in the second semi-final and grand final of the contest, and the breakdown of the jury voting and televoting conducted during the two shows:

Points awarded to Austria

Points awarded by Austria

Detailed voting results
The following members comprised the Austrian jury:
 
 Gabriela Horn (Pænda)
 Peter Pansky
 Drew Sarich
 Norbert Schneider

References 

2021
Countries in the Eurovision Song Contest 2021
Eurovision